Elihu Phinney (1755–1813) was the first printer in Cooperstown, New York.  In the early 1790s he lived in Canaan, Columbia County, New York, where he published the Columbian Mercury, and Canaan Repository of Rural Knowledge.

Phinney was invited to Cooperstown by Judge William Cooper, the wealthy land developer who had established the Otsego County, New York village.  There in 1795, Phinney opened a printing and publishing business.  In his weekly newspaper, The Otsego Herald; or, Western Advertiser, Phinney wrote that he, "in the winter of 1793, penetrated a wilderness, and broke a track, through a deep snow, with six teams, in the 'depth' of winter, and was received with a cordiality, bordering on homage."

It is said that James Fenimore Cooper, Judge Cooper's son and future novelist, frequented Phinney's print shop and there, for his own enjoyment, learned the art of setting type. In fact, James Fenimore Cooper's daughter Caroline married Phinney's grandson, Henry Frederich Phinney, in 1849.

Early on, through his publications, Phinney provided political support for the Federalist Judge Cooper,  but by the end of the first decade of the 19th century, Phinney had begun to support the Clintonian Republicans who by then had become a majority in the county.  Besides endorsing Cooper's political opponents, Phinney went so far as to sponsor a petition to change the name of Cooperstown to "Otsego Village."

Phinney's company contributed to Cooperstown's status as a major publishing center through the first half of the 19th century. His sons, Henry and Elihu Phinney Jr., took over the business in 1813, upon their father's death and became known for the 138 Bible editions that they publishing  between 1822 and 1848, when their company, H. & E. Phinney, moved to Buffalo.

A copy of H. & E. Phinney’s 1828 "Authorized" (i.e., King James) edition of the Bible, containing Old and New Testaments, as well as the Apocrypha was used by Joseph Smith, founder of the Latter Day Saint movement, as a basis for his "translation" of the Bible written between 1830 and 1833.

Besides operating a book shop in Cooperstown, the Phinneys sold books (both their own and those of other American publishers) from large wagons and Erie Canal "bookboats", which helped them expand into Western New York.

From 1833 to 1840, Elihu Phinney, Jr. held office as the supervisor of the Town of Otsego (in which the Village of Cooperstown is located).  Henry Phinney later held the office 1850.

Elihu Phinney's name may now be associated as much with the game of baseball as it is with the publishing business.  It was claimed that Abner Doubleday, the supposed inventor of baseball, regularly played the game on Phinney's farm.  This led to the purchase of the lot for use as a baseball park now called Doubleday Field, which was the site of the annual Baseball Hall of Fame Game.

Bibliography

External links 
George Glazer Gallery: Amos Doolittle, Bonaparte in Trouble, shows an engraving (c.1814) printed on paper which Elihu Phinney produced.
Alan Taylor, Who Murdered William Cooper, quotes Phinney publications reporting Judge Cooper's death.
Philadelphia Rare Books & Manuscripts Company, shows an example of the Phinney edition that was the basis for Joseph Smith's translation.
Doubleday Field, A Diamond in the Pasture, explains how Phinney's farm became the famous baseball park.

1756 births
1813 deaths
American publishers (people)
People from Cooperstown, New York